Wheelhouse or Wheel-house may refer to:

Architecture 
 Wheelhouse (archaeology), a prehistoric structure from the Iron Age found in Scotland
 A building or portion of a building that contains a water wheel
Radstube, a building or underground chamber in a mine housing a water wheel

Transport on water 
Bridge (nautical), also known as a pilothouse, the location of the ship's wheel of a boat or ship
 The covering or housing of a paddle wheel in a paddle steamer also known as the paddle-box

Transport on land 
 Wheelhouse or wheel well, the part of a vehicle body surrounding one of the wheels, typically a fender or a smaller part attached to the inner surface of the fender
 A turntable (rail)-like device which allows wagons to switch tracks
 Doolittle Maintenance and Storage Facility, used for Bay Area Rapid Transit's Beige Line which goes by the nickname of "the Wheelhouse"

Sport 
 In baseball jargon: The sweet spot of a baseball player's strike zone where the most power and strength can be utilized
 An English language idiom derived from the baseball jargon, meaning area of knowledge

Music 
 Wheelhouse (album), a 2013 album by Brad Paisley
 Wheelhouse Records, an imprint of BBR Music Group

Other uses 
 Wheelhouse (surname)
 Wheelhouse Magazine, an online progressive arts and politics magazine
 Wheelhouse Maritime Museum, museum run by the Underwater Society of Ottawa